Revelation Films is a British film and television production and distribution company delivering visual entertainment via cinema, television and digital platforms.

Tony Carne founded Revelation Films in 1992 as a video and television production business following a career at CBS/Fox, HarperCollins and Simitar Entertainment. Initially a production entity, the company earned two BAFTA nominations for the BBC with Out And About, a regional magazine series. It also discovered a raw drag comedian called Paul O’Grady and introduced UK audiences to his alter ego Lily Savage. A national theatre tour followed and the TV show Paying The Rent was broadcast by Channel 4 and the Paramount Comedy Channel. Trevor Drane joined Carne in 1996 having previously been at First Independent Films where he collected a lifetime achievement award for Dirty Dancing and the Freddie Award at Hanna Barbera during his time as head of that companies home entertainment output.

Production 
Revelation Films is currently specialising in documentary programming alongside true-crime author and former Essex Boys gang member, Bernard O'Mahoney.

Recent roster includes 

British Gangsters: Faces Of The Underworld - Based on the book Faces: A Photographic Journey Through The Underworld by Bernard O'Mahoney and Brian Anderson. Ran for two series on Discovery's Quest channel.
Essex Boys: The Truth - Documentary feature chronicling the Rettendon murders, the aftermath and the emergence of the new generation of Essex Boys.
The Krays: Kill Order - Documentary feature about the life and crimes of the Kray twins, told by their closest allies and bitter rivals.
Gangster No.1: The Freddie Foreman Story - Documentary feature in which Foreman talks about his life and how he became one of the most feared men in London.
The Feared: Irish Gangsters - Documentary feature about the undercurrent of violent and organised crime across Ireland.
The Real Manhunter - Documentary series (Sky Crime) based on the casebooks of former Metropolitan Police DCI Colin Sutton.

Other productions include 

Sir Patrick Moore’s Journey To The Stars
Lily Savage Live: Paying The Rent
 I Was There
Starhunter Transformation

Distribution 
Since 1992, Revelation Films has licensed and distributed television and film on DVD and Blu-ray. It has made distribution deals with the BBC, Channel 4, ITV, CBS Home Entertainment, DHX Media, Discovery Communications, Freemantle Media, Funimation, Kew Media (formerly Content Media), MTV and 20th Century Fox.

Release highlights

Film 

 Boss N Up (Snoop Dogg)
 Conversations With Other Women (Helena Bonham Carter)
 El Cantante (Jennifer Lopez)
 Stuart A Life Backwards (Benedict Cumberbatch, Tom Hardy)

Television 

Irwin Allen’s The Time Tunnel, Land Of The Giants and Voyage To The Bottom Of The Sea
 Andromeda
 Dirty Sanchez
 Dr Quinn Medicine Woman
 Goodnight Sweetheart
 Highway To Heaven
Lovejoy
 LA Law
 Rawhide
 Holocaust
 The Winds Of War
 Wire In The Blood
 Doogie Howser MD
 Two Guys, A Girl And A Pizza Place

References

External links
Official website
Twitter
Facebook

Entertainment companies of the United Kingdom
Entertainment companies established in 1992
Mass media companies established in 1992
Video production companies